The Poet Laureate of Connecticut is the poet laureate for the U.S. state of Connecticut. The Poet Laureate of Connecticut was established in 1985 by Public Act 85-221 of the Connecticut General Assembly. Five-year residents of the state with a demonstrated career in poetry are eligible for the honorary appointment as an advocate for poetry and literary arts.

List of Poets Laureate 
The following have held the position: 
 James Merill (1985–1995)
 Leo Connellan (1996–2001)
 Marilyn Nelson (2001–2007)
 John Hollander (2007–2009)
 Dick Allen (2010–2015) 
 Rennie McQuilkin (2015–2018)
 Margaret Gibson (2019–2022)
 Antoinette Brim-Bell (2022 - 2025)

External Links
Poets Laureate of Connecticut at the Library of Congress

See also

 Poet laureate
 List of U.S. states' poets laureate
 United States Poet Laureate

References

 
Connecticut culture
American Poets Laureate